Josef Havel (born 12 February 1982), is a Czech futsal player who plays for Rádio Krokodýl Helas Brno and the Czech Republic national futsal team.

References

External links 
 UEFA profile

1982 births
Living people
Czech men's futsal players